The Official Men's Squash World Ranking is the official world ranking for men's squash. The ranking is to rate the performance level of male professional squash player. It is also a merit-based method used for determining entry and seeding in men's squash tournaments. The rankings are produced monthly. The current world number one is Paul Coll of New Zealand.

PSA ranking policy
Players competing in PSA tournaments earn ranking points according to how far they get in the draw. The points available depend on the prize money and the draw size. The monthly rankings (issued on the 1st of the month) are used in selecting entries to tournaments and in determining the seeds.

The total number of points a player earns in the previous twelve months is divided by the number of tournaments played (a minimum divisor of ten is used) to give a ranking average. Where a player has played more than 10 tournaments the best scores may be selected (i.e. the lowest are not included) according to the Averaging Formula. (See table below.)

For example, a player who has competed in 14 events will have his best 11 scores used.  These will be accumulated and divided by 11.

Players competing in PSA World Tour Events earn ranking points according to the prize money, classification of the event, and the final position in the draw the player reaches.

Divisor
A divisor is selected based on the number of tournaments played during the year as shown in the table below (the minimum divisor is ten).  The average is calculated from the highest points scored for this number of events over the past twelve months:

Current world ranking

Note: The monthly ranking for the men's squash (world ranking) is taken directly from the Professional Squash Association (PSA) official website.

World No. 1 since 1975

Number one ranked players

The following is a list of players who have achieved the world number one position since February 1975 (active players in green) :

Last update: July 2022

Monthly World No 1 since 1975

2022-2025

2018-2021

2014–2017

2010–2013

2006–2009

2002–2005

1998–2001

1994–1997

1990–1993

1986–1989

1982–1985

1978–1981

1975–1977

Note: 
1) Peter Nicol represents England since 21 March 2001.

Year end world top 10 players and ranking point tallies since 1996

2020-2022

2017-2019

2014-2016

2011- 2013

2008–2010

2005–2007

2002–2004

1999–2001

1996–1998

Year-end number 1

 1975:  Qamar Zaman
 1976:  Geoff Hunt
 1977:  Geoff Hunt
 1978:  Geoff Hunt
 1979:  Geoff Hunt
 1980:  Geoff Hunt
 1981:  Qamar Zaman
 1982:  Jahangir Khan
 1983:  Jahangir Khan
 1984:  Jahangir Khan
 1985:  Jahangir Khan
 1986:  Jahangir Khan
 1987:  Jahangir Khan
 1988:  Jahangir Khan
 1989:  Jansher Khan
 1990:  Jansher Khan
 1991:  Jansher Khan
 1992:  Jansher Khan
 1993:  Jansher Khan
 1994:  Jansher Khan
 1995:  Jansher Khan
 1996:  Jansher Khan
 1997:  Jansher Khan
 1998:  Peter Nicol
 1999:  Jonathon Power
 2000:  Peter Nicol
 2001:  David Palmer
 2002:  Peter Nicol
 2003:  Peter Nicol
 2004:  Lee Beachill
 2005:  Thierry Lincou
 2006:  Amr Shabana
 2007:  Amr Shabana
 2008:  Amr Shabana
 2009:  Karim Darwish
 2010:  Ramy Ashour
 2011:  Nick Matthew
 2012:  James Willstrop
 2013:  Ramy Ashour
 2014:  Mohamed El Shorbagy
 2015:  Grégory Gaultier
 2016:  Mohamed El Shorbagy
 2017:  Grégory Gaultier
 2018:  Mohamed El Shorbagy
 2019:  Ali Farag
 2020:  Ali Farag
 2021:  Ali Farag

See also
 List of PSA men's number 1 ranked players
 PSA World Tour
 Official Women's Squash World Ranking
 List of PSA women's number 1 ranked players

References

External links
 PSA official world rankings website 

Squash (sport)
Squash records and statistics
Squash
Squash-related lists